William Lyon Mackenzie was a journalist and politician.

William Lyon Mackenzie may also refer to:
William Lyon Mackenzie Collegiate Institute
William Lyon Mackenzie (fireboat)